Coprinopsis stercorea is a species of coprophilous fungus in the family Psathyrellaceae. It grows on the dung of sheep, goats and donkeys.

See also
List of Coprinopsis species

References

Fungi described in 2001
Fungi of Europe
stercorea